The 1975 Kansas City Chiefs season was the franchise's 6th season in the National Football League, the 13th as the Kansas City Chiefs, and the 16th overall,  it ended with a second consecutive 5–9 record and the Chiefs missed the playoffs for the 4th straight year. San Francisco 49ers defensive coordinator Paul Wiggin was named the second head coach in franchise history on January 23. A former Pro Bowl defensive end for the Cleveland Browns, Wiggin inherited the unenviable task of rebuilding a squad whose pool of talent had been largely depleted due to age and a number of ill-fated trades that had left the club devoid of first-round draft choices in 1973 and 1975. After an 0–3 start to the season, Wiggin directed the Chiefs to three straight wins, beginning with a convincing 42–10 victory against the Raiders on October 12. The highlight of the season was a 34–31 upset win at Dallas on Monday Night Football. The club could not maintain the early success. Owning a 5–5 record heading into the homestretch of the season, injuries to a number of key players crippled the team. The team dropped its final four contests of the year to finish at 5–9 for the second consecutive season. The regular season finale at Oakland marked the final games in the Hall of Fame careers of Len Dawson and Buck Buchanan.

Offseason

NFL Draft

Roster

Schedule

Preseason

Regular season

Standings

Game summaries

Week 1: at Denver Broncos

Week 2: vs. New York Jets

Week 3: vs. San Francisco 49ers

Week 4: vs. Oakland Raiders

Week 5: at San Diego Chargers

Week 6: vs. Denver Broncos

Week 7: vs. Houston Oilers

Week 8: at Dallas Cowboys

Week 9: at Pittsburgh Steelers

Week 10: vs. Detroit Lions

Week 11: at Baltimore Colts

Week 12: vs. San Diego Chargers

Week 13: at Cleveland Browns

Week 14: at Oakland Raiders

References

Kansas City Chiefs
Kansas City Chiefs seasons
Kansas